Baker is an unincorporated community in Adams Township, LaSalle County, Illinois, United States.

References

Unincorporated communities in LaSalle County, Illinois
Unincorporated communities in Illinois